Pablo Tobón Uribe Hospital is private, non-profit hospital located in the Cordoba neighborhood and Robledo municipality of Medellín, Colombia. It is one of the most important health institutions Colombia. It is a Catholic Hospital, and is governed by the principles and teachings of the Catholic Church. It is named after Pablo Tobón Uribe, a Colombian businessman and philanthropist.

Pablo Tobon Uribe Hospital is also a university hospital in character. Students receive training in medicine, nursing, nutrition, psychology, microbiology and administrative agreement with different universities in the city and country areas.

References

Hospitals in Colombia